The Men's 25 metre backstroke juniors incomplete class 2 was one of the events held in swimming at the 1960 Summer Paralympics in Rome.

As there were only two competitors, both men were guaranteed a medal if they finished the race. Karlberg of Norway did so in 26.8s to take gold with a clear lead; Jarrige of France finished in 46.8s to take silver.

References 

Men's 25 metre backstroke juniors incomplete class 2